Philonesia is a genus of air-breathing land snails or semislugs, terrestrial pulmonate gastropod mollusks in the family Euconulidae.

Subtaxa
Philonesia has the following subgenera, species, and subspecies:
Aa H.B.Baker, 1940
Philonesia abeillei (Ancey), 1889
Philonesia gouveiana H.B.Baker, 1940
Philonesia mapulehuae H.B.Baker, 1940
Philonesia sericans (Ancey), 1889
Philonesia waiheensis H.B.Baker, 1940 - type species
Haleakala H.B.Baker, 1940
Philonesia guavarum H.B.Baker, 1940
Philonesia hahakeae H.B.Baker, 1940
Philonesia indefinita (Ancey), 1889
Philonesia interjecta H.B.Baker, 1940
Philonesia pusilla H.B.Baker, 1940
Philonesia turgida (Ancey), 1890
Philonesia turgida diducta H.B.Baker, 1940 - type subspecies
Hiloaa H.B.Baker, 1940
Philonesia hiloi H.B.Baker, 1940 - type species
Philonesia piihonuae H.B.Baker, 1940
Kipua H.B.Baker, 1940
Philonesia arenofunus H.B.Baker, 1940
Philonesia chamissoi (Pfeiffer, 1855 - type species
Mauka H.B.Baker, 1940
Philonesia polita H.B.Baker, 1940
Philonesia similaris H.B.Baker, 1940
Philonesia welchi H.B.Baker, 1940 - type species
Nesarion H.B.Baker, 1940
Philonesia tenuissima H.B.Baker, 1940 - type species
Philonesia tenuissima obesoir H.B.Baker, 1940
Philonesia tenuissima tahuatae H.B.Baker, 1940
Nukupiena H.B.Baker, 1940
Philonesia inflata H.B.Baker, 1940
Philonesia ordinaria H.B.Baker, 1940 - type species
Oafatua H.B.Baker, 1940
Philonesia contigua Garrett, 1887
Philonesia fatuhivae H.B.Baker, 1940
Philonesia lenta Garrett), 1887
Philonesia micra H.B.Baker, 1940
Philonesia pura Garrett, 1887
Philonesia uahukae H.B.Baker, 1940
Philonesia uapouae H.B.Baker, 1940 - type species
Philonesia H.B.Baker, 1940
Philonesia ascendens H.B.Baker, 1940
Philonesia baldwini (Ancey), 1889
Philonesia cicercula (Gould), 1846
Philonesia cicercula boettgeriana (Ancey), 1889
Philonesia cryptoportica (Gould), 1846
Philonesia decepta H.B.Baker, 1940
Philonesia fallax H.B.Baker, 1940
Philonesia fallax popouwelae H.B.Baker, 1940
Philonesia glypha H.B.Baker, 1940
Philonesia hartmanni (Ancey), 1889
Philonesia hartmanni palehuae H.B.Baker, 1940
Philonesia kauaiensis H.B.Baker, 1940
Philonesia kualii H.B.Baker, 1940
Philonesia konahuanui H.B.Baker, 1940
Philonesia maunalei H.B.Baker, 1940
Philonesia mokuleiae H.B.Baker, 1940
Philonesia oahuensis (Ancey), 1889
Philonesia oahuensis depressula (Ancey), 1889
Philonesia perlucens (Ancey), 1889
Philonesia plicosa (Ancey), 1889
Philonesia striata H.B.Baker, 1940
Philonesia waimanaloi H.B.Baker, 1940
Piena Cooke 1940
Philonesia grandis H.B.Baker, 1940 - type species
Philonesia parva H.B.Baker, 1940
Philonesia palawai H.B.Baker, 1940
Pitcairnia H.B.Baker, 1940
Philonesia filiceti Beck, 1940
Philonesia mangarevae H.B.Baker, 1940
Philonesia pitcairnensis H.B.Baker, 1940 - type species
Rapafila H.B.Baker, 1940
Philonesia tenuior H.B.Baker, 1940
Philonesia zimmermani H.B.Baker, 1940 - type species
Philonesia zimmermani tautautui H.B.Baker, 1940 - type species
Uafatua H.B.Baker, 1940
Philonesia fusca (Pease), 1868
Philonesia helicarion H.B.Baker, 1940 - type species
Philonesia obliqua H.B.Baker, 1940
Waihoua H.B.Baker, 1940
Philonesia kaliella H.B.Baker, 1940 - type species
incertae sedis
Philonesia pertenuis (Gould), 1846

References

 Bank, R. A. (2017). Classification of the Recent terrestrial Gastropoda of the World. Last update: July 16th, 2017

External links
 Sykes, E. R. (1900). Fauna Hawaiiensis. University Press, Cambridge. Volume II, Part IV, Mollusca: pp. 271–412, pls 11, 12

 
Gastropod genera
Molluscs of Oceania
Gastropods described in 1900
Euconulidae
Taxonomy articles created by Polbot